Poul Helgesen (also Paul Eliasen; Latin: Paulus Heliæ; ca. 1480 – died after 1534) was a Danish Carmelite, a humanist and historian.

Life
Helgesen, the leading Danish example of Reform Catholicism (a minor Danish parallel of Erasmus of Rotterdam) came from the province of Halland. He became a brother of the Carmelite Order and, based at the Carmelite priory, if which he was briefly superintendent, made himself a career as a teacher of theology in Copenhagen. His ideal seems to have been a Christian-human royal power taking care of intellectual and cultural values. Relatively early he opposed King Christian II and at the fall of the king 1523 he was a representative of the rebellious noblemen, probably writing the complaint against the deposed king. However the religious line of the new king, Frederick I, disappointed him gravely.

Though a sharp critic of abuse and decline within the Roman Catholic Church he took up a quite unsympathetic attitude to the Protestant opposition and as a participant in the religious debate of the 1520s he could not avoid being a mouthpiece of the established church. He was engaged in a heated and often injuring polemic against the reformers 

without being fully trusted by the prelates and the religious and political development in Denmark gradually made him an isolated man. After the death of King Frederick 1533 Helgesen successfully accused the reformer Hans Tausen of heresy but the yielding attitude of the Catholic bishops and the outbreak of the Count's Feud made his results fruitless. During this war Helgesen disappears from history: whether he was killed, died of natural causes or left the country is an unsolved mystery.

Works
Helgesen was an industrious author and historian but some of his works are lost. Among them must be mentioned his translation of Erasmus’ Institutio Principis Christiani (1522) that also indicates his own ideals. An independent work is his Historia Compendiose (about 1523), a short account of Danish kings and their relationship. In addition some polemic writings against both Protestants and traditional Catholics are preserved showing his temper as well as his theological knowledge. His main work is however the unfinished Skibby Chronicle which mainly deals with his own times. It is anonymous but all modern Danish historians recognise him as its author. Often poorly drawn up and mixing great and small events it is nevertheless a monument of his firm political and religious attitudes.

Though our knowledge of the life and personality of Helgesen is only fragmentary he still appears a rather living figure due to his outspoken personal engagement and his temperamental language that shows a man at the borderline of two epochs. He is the most outstanding Danish representative of late Catholic intellectual humanism.

References
Dansk Biografisk Leksikon, vol. 6, 1980
Salmonsens Konversationsleksikon, vol. IX, 1921
Catholic Encyclopedia

External links

1480s births
16th-century deaths
Danish Roman Catholics
16th-century Danish historians
Carmelites